Millardia is a genus of rodent in the family Muridae native to South Asia and Myanmar. 
It contains the following species:
 Sand-colored soft-furred rat (Millardia gleadowi)
 Miss Ryley's soft-furred rat (Millardia kathleenae)
 Kondana soft-furred rat (Millardia kondana)
 Soft-furred rat (Millardia meltada)

References

 
Rodent genera
Taxa named by Oldfield Thomas
Taxonomy articles created by Polbot